Ridgeway is a town in Fairfield County, South Carolina, United States. The population was 319 at the 2010 census. It is part of the Columbia, South Carolina Metropolitan Statistical Area.

History
Blink Bonnie, Camp Welfare, Century House, Hunter House, Mount Hope, Ridgeway Historic District, Ruff's Chapel, St. Stephen's Episcopal Church, Valencia, Vaughn's Stage Coach Stop, and the Monroe Wilson House are listed on the National Register of Historic Places.

Geography
Ridgeway is located in southeastern Fairfield County at  (34.305777, -80.961390). U.S. Route 21 passes through the towns, leading north  to Great Falls and south  to Columbia. South Carolina Highway 34 leads west  to Interstate 77 and east  to Lugoff.

Demographics

As of the census of 2000, there were 328 people, 138 households, and 96 families residing in the town. The population density was 692.7 people per square mile (269.5/km2). There were 157 housing units at an average density of 331.6 per square mile (129.0/km2). The racial makeup of the town was 60.37% White, 37.50% African American, 0.30% Native American, 0.30% from other races, and 1.52% from two or more races.

There were 138 households, out of which 27.5% had children under the age of 18 living with them, 50.0% were married couples living together, 18.1% had a female householder with no husband present, and 30.4% were non-families. 27.5% of all households were made up of individuals, and 10.9% had someone living alone who was 65 years of age or older. The average household size was 2.38 and the average family size was 2.91.

In the town, the population was spread out, with 23.5% under the age of 18, 4.6% from 18 to 24, 30.5% from 25 to 44, 28.0% from 45 to 64, and 13.4% who were 65 years of age or older. The median age was 41 years. For every 100 females, there were 80.2 males. For every 100 females age 18 and over, there were 78.0 males.

The median income for a household in the town was $36,250, and the median income for a family was $49,375. Males had a median income of $35,833 versus $25,469 for females. The per capita income for the town was $14,884. About 24.1% of families and 25.3% of the population were below the poverty line, including 30.1% of those under age 18 and 34.2% of those age 65 or over.

Education
Ridgeway has a public library, a branch of the Fairfield County Library.

Notable people 

 Alex Sanders
Mamie Johnson

References

External links
 Town of Ridgeway official website

Towns in Fairfield County, South Carolina
Towns in South Carolina
Columbia metropolitan area (South Carolina)